Joseph Stanislaus Solomon (born 26 August 1930) is a former international cricketer who played 27 Test matches for the West Indies from 1958 to 1965, scoring 1,326 runs, mainly from number six and seven in the batting line-up.

Life and career
Solomon was born in Port Mourant, Berbice, British Guiana (now Guyana). He is the only player in first-class cricket history to score hundreds in his first three innings, for British Guiana in 1956–57 and 1957–58. He was selected to tour India in 1958–59 with the West Indies team. He was successful in the Test series, scoring a century in the Fifth Test at Delhi and finishing with 351 runs at an average of 117.00.

He was less successful in later series, but he often batted steadily when the need was greatest. He also bowled occasional leg-breaks, but was best-known as a brilliant fieldsman. In the first Tied Test in 1960, his throw from square-leg hit the stumps directly to run out Ian Meckiff, who was going for the winning run. In the next Test, he was out hit wicket after his cap fell on the stumps. He toured England in 1963 and 1966. 

He played first-class cricket for British Guiana/Guyana from 1956–57 to 1968–69. His highest first-class score was 201 not out for Berbice against the touring MCC in March 1960, when he added an unbroken partnership of 290 with Basil Butcher.

Solomon continued to served Guyanese cricket in various capacities after his retirement from playing, including the presidency of the Guyana Cricket Board and several years as a selector. He was awarded the Golden Arrow of Achievement by the government of Guyana. He and his wife Betty had six children. He has lived in New York since 1984, travelling back to Guyana once a year. He is the oldest living West Indies Test cricketer.

References

External links

Further reading
 Clem Seecharan, Joe Solomon and the Spirit of Port Mourant (2022)

1930 births
Living people
Guyanese cricketers
West Indies Test cricketers
Berbice cricketers
Guyana cricketers
People from East Berbice-Corentyne
Guyanese cricket administrators